KEKA-FM (101.5 MHz) is a radio station broadcasting a classic country format. Licensed to Eureka, California, United States, it serves the Eureka area. The station is currently owned by Eureka Broadcasting Co., Inc. and features programming from Fox News Radio and Jones Radio Network.

External links

EKA-FM
Mass media in Humboldt County, California